Dichomeris litoxyla is a moth in the family Gelechiidae. It was described by Edward Meyrick in 1937. It is found in Transbaikalia, south-eastern Siberia and Korea.

Adults are similar to Dichomeris derasella, but the forewings are broader and slightly dilated distally, there is also a dark brown fascia along the termen and the discal stigmata are more distinct, often irregularly suffused with dark brown scales.

References

Moths described in 1937
isoclera